The 2023 Seattle City Council election will be held on November 7, 2023. Seven seats of the nine-member Seattle City Council are up for election.

Background
The Seattle Redistricting Commission approved a new map for the city council districts on November 8, 2022. The 2023 election cycle is the fourth to use Seattle's democracy voucher program.

1st district

Campaign
Incumbent Lisa Herbold is not running for re-election. Social worker and former army medic Preston Anderson, Eltana restaurateur Stephen Brown, climate activist Maren Costa, AnnaLisa Lafayette, Meta lawyer Rob Saka, and lawyer Phillip Tavel, runner-up for the 1st district in 2019, are running for the seat.

Campaign finance
All of the candidates are participating in the democracy voucher program.

Endorsements

2nd district

Campaign
Incumbent Tammy Morales is running for re-election. She is being challenged by Dawn Lucas, Isaiah Willoughby and community organizer Tanya Woo. Seattle Parks Sustainability and Environmental Engagement manager Chukundi Salisbury has been named as a potential candidate.

In 2021, Willoughby plead guilty to charges of arson committed during the events of the Capitol Hill Occupied Protest.

Campaign finance
Tammy Morales, Isaiah Willoughby and Tanya Woo are participating in the democracy voucher program.

Endorsements

3rd district

Campaign
Incumbent Kshama Sawant is not running for re-election.
Running for the seat are:
Shobhit Agarwal
Ry Armstrong, genderqueer actor
Andrew Ashiofu, Seattle LGBTQ+ Commission co-chair
Alex Cooley, cannabis business co-founder
Robert Goodwin, public defender
Joy Hollingsworth, Transportation Choices Coalition executive director
Efrain Hudnell, deputy prosecutor in the King County Prosecuting Attorney's office
Alex Hudson, former director of the First Hill Improvement Association
Asukaa Jaxx, who ran for the district in 2019
Theodore Mostert

Campaign finance
All of the candidates are participating in the democracy voucher program.

4th district

Campaign
Incumbent Alex Pedersen is not running for re-election. George Artem, entrepreneur Ron Davis, University of Washington graduate student Matthew Mitnick, deputy director of the Department of Arts & Culture Maritza Rivera, and engineer Kenneth Wilson, runner-up in the 8th district in 2021, are running for the seat. State representative Gerry Pollet is reportedly considering a campaign.

Campaign finance
All of the candidates are participating in the democracy voucher program.

Endorsements

5th district

Campaign
City Council president Debora Juarez is not running for re-election. Lucca Howard, Nilu Jenks, Shane Macomber, social equity consultant ChrisTiana ObeySumner, Justin Simmons and Sinh Tran (TruongSinh Tran-Nguyen) are running for the seat.

Campaign finance
All of the candidates are participating in the democracy voucher program.

6th district

Campaign
Incumbent Dan Strauss is running for re-election. He is being challenged Fremont Chamber of Commerce executive Peter Hanning.

Campaign finance
All of the candidates are participating in the democracy voucher program.

Endorsements

7th district

Campaign
Incumbent Andrew J. Lewis is running for re-election. He is being challenged by Isabelle Kenrer, who ran for this district in 2019.

Campaign finance
Both of the candidates are participating in the democracy voucher program.

Endorsements

Notes

References

External links
Official campaign websites for 1st district candidates
Preston Anderson for City Council
Stephen Brown for City Council
Maren Costa for City Council
AnnaLisa Lafayette for City Council
Rob Saka for City Council
Phillip Tavel for City Council

Official campaign websites for 2nd district candidates
Tammy Morales for City Council
Tanya Woo for City Council

Official campaign websites for 3rd district candidates
Ry Armstrong for City Council
Andrew Ashiofu for City Council
Alex Cooley for City Council
Robert Goodwin for City Council
Joy Hollingsworth for City Council
Efrain Hudnell for City Council
Alex Hudson for City Council

Official campaign websites for 4th district candidates
Ron Davis for City Council
Matthew Mitnick for City Council
Maritza Rivera for City Council
Kenneth Wilson for City Council
Official campaign websites for 5th district candidates
Lucca Howard for City Council
Nilu Jenks for City Council
Shane Macomber for City Council
ChrisTiana Obeysumner for City Council
Justin Simmons for City Council
Sinh Tran for City Council

Official campaign websites for 6th district candidates
Pete Hanning for City Council
Dan Strauss for City Council

Official campaign websites for 7th district candidates
Isabelle Kerner for City Council
Andrew J. Lewis for City Council

Seattle City Council
Seattle City Council
Seattle City Council 2023